William Brennan may refer to:

William Brennan (Australian politician) (1865–1937), member of the New South Wales Parliament
William Brennan (baseball) (born 1963), Major League Baseball pitcher
William C. Brennan (1918–2000), New York politician and judge
William J. Brennan Jr. (1906–1997), justice of the United States Supreme Court
William John Brennan (1938–2013), Australian Roman Catholic bishop
William Joseph Brennan (bishop) (1904–1975), Roman Catholic priest in Australia
Willis Brennan (1893–1950), American football player
Willy Brennan (died 1804), Irish highwayman
Bill Brennan (umpire) (1880–1933), Major League Baseball umpire and college football coach
Bill Brennan (boxer) (1893–1924), American boxer
Bill Brennan (activist) (born 1968), candidate for Governor of New Jersey in 2017
Bill Brennan (journalist), American sports journalist
Billy Brennan (born 1934), British ice hockey player